Marshall L. Starks (March 6, 1939-July 31, 2016) was a former professional American football defensive back who played cornerback for two seasons for the New York Jets of the American Football League.

See also
 List of NCAA major college yearly punt and kickoff return leaders

External links
New York Jets player page
Obituary

1939 births
Living people
American football cornerbacks
Edmonton Elks players
Illinois Fighting Illini football players
New York Jets players
American Football League players